Muisca numerals were the numeric notation system used by the Muisca, one of the civilizations of the Americas before the Spanish conquest of the Muisca. Just like the Mayas, the Muisca had a vigesimal numerical system, based on multiples of twenty (Chibcha: gueta). The Muisca numerals were based on counting with fingers and toes. They had specific numbers from one to ten, yet for the numbers between eleven and nineteen they used "foot one" (11) to "foot nine" (19). The number 20 was the 'perfect' number for the Muisca which is visible in their calendar. To calculate higher numbers than 20 they used multiples of their 'perfect' number; gue-muyhica would be "20 times 4", so 80. To describe "50" they used "20 times 2 plus 10"; gue-bosa asaqui ubchihica, transcribed from guêboʒhas aſaqɣ hubchìhicâ. In their calendar, which was lunisolar, they only counted from one to ten and twenty. Each number had a special meaning, related to their deities and certain animals, especially the abundant toads.

For the representation of their numbers they used digits inspired by their natural surroundings, especially toads; ata ("one") and aca ("nine") were both derived from the animals so abundant on the Bogotá savanna and other parts of the Altiplano Cundiboyacense where the Muisca lived in their confederation.

The most important scholars who provided knowledge about the Muisca numerals were Bernardo de Lugo (1619), Pedro Simón (17th century), Alexander von Humboldt and José Domingo Duquesne (late 18th and 19th century) and Liborio Zerda.

Numerals 
The Muisca used a vigesimal counting system and counted primarily with their fingers and secondarily with their toes. Their system went from 1 to 10 and for higher numerations they used the prefix quihicha or qhicha, which means "foot" in their Chibcha language Muysccubun. Eleven became thus "foot one", twelve: "foot two", etc. As in the other pre-Columbian civilizations, the number 20 was special. It was the total number of all body extremities; fingers and toes. The Muisca used two forms to express twenty: "foot ten"; quihícha ubchihica or their exclusive word gueta, derived from gue, which means "house". Numbers between 20 and 30 were counted gueta asaqui ata ("twenty plus one"; 21), gueta asaqui ubchihica ("twenty plus ten"; 30). Larger numbers were counted as multiples of twenty; gue-bosa ("20 times 2"; 40), gue-hisca ("20 times 5"; 100).

The numeral symbols below were first provided by Duquesne and reproduced by Humboldt, Acosta, and Zerda. These glyphs have been criticized and their authenticity questioned, as they are “practically nonexistent” in the surviving archaeological record, including the calendar stone from Choachí. Potentially, they might represent asterisms or months instead of numerals.

Numbers 1 to 10 and 20

Higher numbers

See also 

Muisca art
Muysccubun
Quipu - Inca numerals
Muisca calendar
Maya numerals

References

Bibliography 
  
 
 
 
 
  

 
Muisca
Muisca
1